Sybrinus is a genus of longhorn beetles of the subfamily Lamiinae, containing the following species:

subgenus Arabosybrinus
 Sybrinus albosignatus Breuning, 1948
 Sybrinus crassipes Breuning, 1950
 Sybrinus flavescens Breuning, 1948
 Sybrinus grossepunctipennis Breuning, 1950
 Sybrinus persimilis Breuning, 1950

subgenus Sokotrosybrinus
 Sybrinus simonyi Gahan, 1903

subgenus Sybrinus
 Sybrinus commixtus Gahan, 1900
 Sybrinus x-ornatus Téocchi, Jiroux & Sudre, 2007

References

Desmiphorini
Cerambycidae genera